James Alexander Robb,  (10 August 1859 – November 11, 1929) was a Canadian Member of Parliament and cabinet minister. Robb was a member of the Liberal Party of Canada.

He served as Liberal Party Whip from 1919 to 1921.

From 5 September 1925 to 28 June 1926 and again from 25 September 1926 until his death, he served as Minister of Finance in the administration of William Lyon Mackenzie King. He served briefly as Acting Minister of National Defence in October 1926.

References

External links 
 

1859 births
1929 deaths
Canadian Ministers of Finance
Members of the House of Commons of Canada from Quebec
Liberal Party of Canada MPs
Laurier Liberals
Members of the King's Privy Council for Canada
People from Montérégie